Kangeyampatti is a village in the Thanjavur taluk of Thanjavur district, Tamil Nadu, India.

Demographics 

As per the 2001 census, Kangeyampatti had a total population of 1384 with  694 males and  690 females. The sex ratio was 994. The literacy rate was 70.75.

References 

 

Villages in Thanjavur district